Yoshii may refer to:

Places
Yoshii, Fukuoka, a former town in Fukuoka Prefecture
Yoshii, Gunma, a former town in Gunma Prefecture
Yoshii, Nagasaki, a former town in Nagasaki Prefecture
Yoshii, Okayama (Akaiwa) （吉井町）, a former town in Akaiwa District, Okayama Prefecture
Yoshii, Okayama (Shitsuki) （芳井町）, a former town in Shitsuki District, Okayama Prefecture

Other uses
Yoshii (surname)